The LMU Klinikum (until 2020 Klinikum der Universität München) is the merged hospital complex of the Ludwig Maximilian University of Munich (LMU), including the Campus Innenstadt in the city center and the Campus Großhadern in Hadern. The hospital houses more than 2000 beds with 48 clinics, institutes and departments, making it one of the largest hospitals in Europe. In 2015, the Ludwig Maximilian University was ranked the leading German university in the subject area "Clinical, pre-clinical and health" according to the Times Higher Education World University Ranking.

Campus Großhadern
The Campus Großhadern (formerly Klinikum Großhadern) of the Ludwig Maximilian University of Munich in the Großhadern district of Hadern is the largest hospital complex in Munich, owing to its affiliated institutions and 1,418 beds. In 1994 the new buildings of the Genzentrum (gene center) belonging to the LMU were put into operation and in 1999 the entire chemical/pharmaceutical faculty was relocated to the HighTech CampusLMU in Hadern. After the merger with the Klinikum Innenstadt, the exact definition of the complex is LMU Klinikum - Campus Großhadern.

The organ transplantation department of the clinic is one of the leading organ transplantation clinics in Germany. All clinically established forms of organ transplantation are implemented, e.g. Heart, Heart & Lung (simultaneously), Lungs (one or two) Pancreas, Kidney and Pancreas & Kidney simultaneously. Aside from patient care the clinic also plays an important role in clinical and theoretical research, and student education. Attached to the clinic is a school of nursing.

As well as accommodating vehicles used for the emergencies, the clinic is also a base for the "Christoph München" rescue helicopter.

Campus Innenstadt
The Campus Innenstadt in downtown Munich has Departments of Allergology and Dermatology, Anaesthesiology, Child and Adolescent Psychiatry, Emergency Medicine, Gynaecology, Internal Medicine, Maxillofacial Surgery, Nuclear Medicine, Ophthalmology, Pediatrcis and Pediatric Surgery (Dr. von Hauner Children's Hospital), Psychiatry and Psychotherapy, Radiology, Rehabilitative Medicine and Surgery. After the merger with the Klinikum Großhadern, the exact definition of the complex is LMU Klinikum - Campus Innenstadt.

See also
 Klinikum Großhadern (Munich U-Bahn)

References

External links

 Official site of LMU Klinikum 
 Official site of Christoph München 

Buildings and structures in Munich
Ludwig Maximilian University of Munich
Hospitals in Germany
Medical and health organisations based in Bavaria